The Ghana National Mosque is a mosque in Ghana. It is the second largest mosque in West Africa.

The mosque was built at a cost of $10 million. It was funded by the Turkish Hudai Foundation in Accra with the support of the Turkish government.

The complex includes a residence for the imam, a school and a library.

History 
The construction began in 2012. Osman Nuhu Sharubutu in his speech claimed Jerry John Rawlings and others helped in the securing of the land for the realization of the project for Muslims in Ghana. In 1995, JJ Rawlings gave out the land to replace a mosque he destroyed for the building of Rawlings Park in Accra. The project was started by the Muslim Community in Ghana and was abandoned close to 10 years because of lack of funds.

Architecture and features 
The mosque is built in an Ottoman revival style with four signature minarets towering about 65m above the ground. It is claimed to be a replica of the Blue Mosque. It is made of carrara marble exterior fittings. The upper levels of the interior of the mosque are dominated by blue paints, with stained glass windows with designs. The inner decorations are made of hand-drawn calligraphic verses of the Quran. The floors are covered with carpets. The mosque has a mihrab made from sculptured marbles, with a stalactite niche and a double inscriptive panel above it. The exterior feature is arranged with cascade of domes around the main dome.

Location 
The mosque is located at Kanda(Kawukudi) in Accra.

Commissioning 
The mosque was commissioned on Friday 16th July 2021 by Nana Akufo-Addo. The commissioning was attended by president Mohammed Bazoum and former president Mahamadou Issoufou of Niger. Also in attendance was Mahamudu Bawumia, Fuat Oktay, Ali Erbas, and Osman Nuhu Sharubutu .

Facilities 
The mosque is claimed to be a 15,000 seater-capacity mosque complex built on a 42-acre land. It has an office complex for the National Chief Imam,project managers and others; a morgue, a library, a school, dormitories, workers and guests residences; and a fitted clinic with laboratories and a pharmacy. It has a minaret which can be seen from many parts of Accra.

Gallery

References 

2021 establishments in Ghana
Buildings and structures in Accra
Mosques in Ghana
Mosques completed in 2021